Middle Welsh is the label attached to the Welsh language of the 12th to 15th centuries, of which much more remains than for any earlier period. This form of Welsh developed directly from Old Welsh.

Literature and history
Middle Welsh is the language of nearly all surviving early manuscripts of the Mabinogion, although the tales themselves are certainly much older. It is also the language of most of the manuscripts of Welsh law. Middle Welsh is reasonably intelligible, albeit with some work, to a modern-day Welsh speaker.

Phonology
The phonology of Middle Welsh is quite similar to that of modern Welsh, with only a few differences. The diphthong aw is found in unstressed final syllables in Middle Welsh, while in Modern Welsh it has become o (e.g. Middle Welsh  = Modern Welsh  "horseman"). Similarly, the Middle Welsh diphthongs ei and eu have become ai and au in final syllables, e. g. Middle Welsh  = modern  "seven", Middle Welsh  = modern  "sun".

The vowels are as follows:

Vowel length is predictable: vowels are long in monosyllables unless followed by a geminate or one of the consonants /p/, /t/, /k/, /m/, /ŋ/ or a geminate.  The vowels could combine into the following falling diphthongs:

1. ending in /w/: /aw/, /ew/, /iw/, /ɨw/ ~ /əw/

2. ending in /ɨ/: /aɨ/, /oɨ/, /uɨ/

3. others: /ej/, /eʉ/ (and possibly /æj/, /æʉ/)

The diphthongs /æj/ and /æʉ/, whose first component gradually changed into /a/, were originally allophones of /ej/ and /eʉ/, respectively, and no distinction between the two was expressed in Middle Welsh spelling, so their presence during most of Middle Welsh is not immediately observable. However, the fact that the modern pronunciations beginning with an /a/ occur in all word-final syllables, regardless of stress, makes it plausible that their distinctness from /ej/ and /eʉ/ was a legacy from the time before the stress shifted from final to penultimate syllables in Old Welsh. The full opening to /aj/ and /aʉ/ may have been completed at some point in later Middle Welsh, possibly the thirteenth to fourteenth centuries.

The consonants are as follows:

Consonants may be geminate. /ʃ/ is mostly found in loanwords such as siacet 'jacket'.

Stress was placed on the penultimate syllable with some exceptions such as the causative verbs in -háu, e.g. sicrháu ('to make things secure' from sicr secure'). In terms of intonation, the tonal peak must have been aligned with the post-stress syllable, reflecting the earlier final stress of the late Brythonic period, since this persists even in Modern Welsh.

Orthography

 Differences from modern Welsh 
The orthography of Middle Welsh was not standardised, and there is great variation between manuscripts in how certain sounds are spelled. Some generalisations of differences between Middle Welsh spelling and Modern Welsh spelling can be made. For example, the possessive adjectives  "his, her",  "their" and the preposition  "to" are very commonly spelled  in Middle Welsh, and are thus spelled the same as the definite article  and the indirect relative particle . The voiced stop consonants  are represented by the letters t c at the end of a word, e.g. "protection" (modern ),  "running" (modern ). The sound  is very often spelled k before the vowels e i y (in Modern Welsh, it is always spelled with a c, e.g. Middle Welsh  = modern  "third cousin"). The sound  is usually spelled with a u or v (these are interchangeable as in Latin MSS), except at the end of a word, where it is spelled with an f (in Modern Welsh, it is always spelled with a f, e.g. Middle Welsh  = modern  "apple tree"). The sound  is usually spelled with a d (in Modern Welsh, it is spelled with a dd, e.g. Middle Welsh  = modern  "day"). Middle Welsh  "running" vs. modern ). The epenthetic vowel /ə/ is usually written, in contrast to Modern Welsh: e.g. mwnwgyl rather than mwnwgl "neck".

 Letter-sound correspondences 
In general, the spelling is both variable and historical and does not reflect some sound changes that had taken place by the Middle Welsh period, most notably the lenition. Some of the less predictable letter-sound correspondences are the following:

Grammar

 Morphology 

 Notable differences from modern Welsh 
Middle Welsh is closer to the other medieval Celtic languages, e.g. Old Irish, in its morphology. For example, the endings -wŷs, -ws, -es and -as are used for 3rd person singular of the preterite in Middle Welsh as well as the form -odd. In the same person and tense exists the old reduplicated preterite kigleu 'he heard' of the verb klywet 'to hear', which corresponds to the Old Irish ·cúalae '(s)he heard' from the verb ro·cluinethar '(s)he hears'.

Middle Welsh also retains more plural forms of adjectives that do not appear in modern Welsh, e.g. cochion, plural of coch 'red'.

The nominal plural ending -awr is very common in Middle Welsh, but has been replaced in modern Welsh by -au.

 Morphonology 
Like modern Welsh, Middle Welsh exhibits in its morphology numerous vowel alternations as well as the typical Insular Celtic initial consonant mutations.

 Vowels 
There is a productive alternation between final syllables and non-final syllables known as mutationMorris-Jones 1913 or centring, which is by necessity triggered by the addition of any suffix and operates as follows:

The centring mutation is due to a process of vowel reduction that operated earlier, in late Brythonic, when the stress was placed on the last syllable.

Further, there are two types of alternations that are caused by following vowels (extant or lost) and are no longer entirely productive, but nonetheless very frequent in the morphology. The first type is ultimate affection, which occurs in the last syllable of a word and is caused by a vowel that used to be located in the next syllable. The originally triggering vowel is either i or a, hence the alternations are referred to as i-affection and a-affection. The more common type is i-affection, which occurs in plurals with a zero ending and in the present singular of many verbs. In addition, in some cases, the singular has an affected vowel, but the plural does not (this has been termed 'reversion'). The alternation operates as follows:

Ultimate a-affection is found, most notably, in the feminine forms of adjectives that do have gender declension, and it changes the stem vowels as follows:Morris-Jones 1913:120

The second type of affection is triggered by (typically) extant close vowels or semivowels in the following syllables, and is hence known as penultimate affection (in fact, it also reaches the antepenult in Middle Welsh). The effect varies somewhat depending on the triggering vowel, hence one may speak more specifically, for instance, of y-affection. Penultimate y-affection is a regular feature of verb forms with an ending containing y (e.g. the second person singular and plural in the present indicative). Both it and other types of penultimate affection may also occur due to the addition of suffixes containing the respective vowels, e.g. in the plural of nouns.

Penultimate and ultimate affection may occur in one and the same form, e.g. castell 'castle' - pl. kestyll, manach 'monk' - meneich 'monks', or, with reversion, elein 'fawn' - pl. alaned (the latter two may then be termed cases of ei-affection').

Consonants 
In contrast to modern Welsh, the consonant mutations aren't always reflected in Middle Welsh orthography; this is especially true of the nasal mutation.

1. Lenition / soft mutation

Lenition turns voiceless stop consonants into voiced ones and voiced stops into fricatives (further turning into zero in the case of /ɣ/). 

It occurs most notably:

a. in the second members of compounds: march 'horse' > moruarch 'sea-horse, whale';

b. in a noun preceded by the possessive pronouns for 3rd singular masculine and 2nd singular possessors (y 'his' and dy/th 'thy'): kyuoeth 'wealth, realm' > y gyuoeth 'his wealth, realm';

c. in a noun preceded by the numerals 1, 2 and 7: march 'horse' > deu uarch 'two horses';

d. in a noun or adjective preceded by a name that it describes: brenhin 'king' > Keredic Vrenhin 'Ceredig the king'; bendigeit 'blessed' > Catwaladyr Uendigeit 'Cadwaladr the blessed';

e. in a possessor noun or an adjective preceded by a feminine singular noun or a semantically dual noun: Morgant > gulat Uorgant 'the land of Morgan', tec 'fair' > y wreic deccaf 'the fairest lady', mawr 'big' > deu uarch uawr 'two big horses';

f. in a feminine singular noun preceded by the definite article: gwreig > y wreig 'the woman';

g. in a noun following the prepositions a, am, ar, at, dan, gan, heb, hyt, y, is, o, tros, trwy, uch, wrth, the conjunction neu or the vocative particle a;

h. in a noun functioning as the subject after some verbal forms (in contrast to modern Welsh). It is common after many 3rd person forms of the verb 'to be', and after the 3rd person singular imperfect and pluperfect (sometimes also preterite) of other verbs. It also occurs in subjects separated from their verbs;

i. in a noun functioning as the object after most verbal forms, but sometimes not after the 3rd singular present and preterite;

j. in a noun or adjective functioning as a nominal predicate after the verb 'to be' or the predicative particles yn and y: mawr 'big' > ot oed uawr ef 'if he was big';

k. in a noun or adjective used adverbially (including after the adverbial particle yn);

l. in a verb after the relative pronoun a, the interrogative pronouns pa, py and cwt, the interrogative particle a, the negative particles ny and na, the affirmative particles neu, ry and a, the particle yt, many prefixes such as go- and di-, the conjunctions pan, tra and yny;

m. in the verb 'to be' after a nominal predicate.

2. Nasal mutation

The nasal mutation replaces stops with corresponding nasals (while keeping them voiceless if the original stops were voiceless):

It occurs:

a. after the preposition yn 'in' (and sometimes also the predicative and adverbial particle yn): pob 'every' > ymhob 'in every'. This doesn't occur with verbal nouns.

b. the possessive pronoun vy 'my': brawt 'brother' > vy mrawt 'my brother'

c. the numerals 7, 9, 19, 12, 15, 100, and by extension some others.

3. Spirant mutation

The spirant mutation replaced voiceless stops with fricatives:

It occurs after:

a. the possessive pronoun for 3rd singular feminine possessors y 'her': penn 'head' > y phenn 'her head'

b. the conjunction/preposition a 'and, with', the conjunctions no 'than', na 'neither, nor' and o 'if', the preposition and adverb tra 'over, very'.

c. the negative particles ny, na (note that these also cause the spirant mutation), the affirmative particles neu and ry, many prefixes such as go- and di- (note that these also cause lenition of the other mutable consonants)

d. the numerals 3 and 6.

e. the interrogative cw 'where?'

4. Aspiration (sandhi h)

The consonant h appears initially before vowels after certain pronouns, namely the possessive pronouns y 'her', yn/an 'our', eu/y(w) 'their' and the 1st singular 'infixed' pronoun -m as well as the 'infixed' pronoun -e/y when it expresses a 3rd person object (be it singular masculine, singular feminine, or plural); e.g. wynneb 'face' > y hwynneb 'her face'.

5. Provection

Provection is a phenomenon that causes devoicing of consonants within certain medial consonant clusters that may arise via morphological processes. Two identical voiced stops yield a voiceless geminate stop (e.g. d + d > tt), a voiced stop is devoiced before another voiced stop or voiceless consonant (d + b > tb or tp), a voiced consonant may be devoiced before a sonorant (d + r > tr) and is always devoiced before a voiceless consonant (d + s > ts) and merges with a following /h/ into a voiceless geminate (e.g. d + h > tt).

Nouns 
There are two genders, masculine and feminine.

There is a definite article which precedes the noun phrase and has the form y- before a consonant and yr- before a vowel or /h/.

Noun plurals may end in a variety of unpredictable endings such as -eu, -(i)on, -oed, -ed, -yd, -et, -ot, -(i)eit, -awt, -awr, -ant, -er, -yr, -i or zero suffix with ultimate i affection in the root). A vowel change may also accompany the addition of an ending; apart from the predictable option of centering, that vowel change may also be a penultimate i, y or j affection (before -ion, -ieit, -i, -yd or rarely -ieu) or, conversely, a reversion of ultimate i affection before endings such as -eu, -on, -ed and -ot. The special plural suffix -os has diminutive meaning. There are also singulative endings -yn (masculine) and -en (feminine), which produce singulars not only from collectives, but also from plurals: blew 'hair' > blewyn 'a hair'; llyc 'mouse' > llygot 'mice' > llygoden 'mouse'.

There is no grammatical case. Nouns may be placed after another nouns to express a possessor, sometimes triggering a mutation, for which see above.

Adjectives
Some, but not all adjectives may have special plural and feminine forms, and concord is not always observed. The plurals may be formed with a zero ending and ultimate i-affection or with the ending -(y)on /-(j)on/, which may also cause mutation or penultimate j-affection. The adjective-forming suffixes -adwy, -eit, -in, -lyt never allow plural formation. Feminine forms of adjectives are derived from masculine ones via ultimate a-affection.

The equative degree is formed by the suffix -(h)et, the preposed particle mor or the prefix ky(f)-. The forms in -(h)et are preceded by ky(n). E.g. ky uelynet oed a'r eur 'it was as yellow as gold'. The comparative is formed with the suffix -ach (the comparandum is introduced by the aspirating conjunction no(c) 'than') and the superlative uses the suffix -(h)af (the comparandum is introduced with the preposition o 'of').

Adjectives could be used adverbially when preceded by the particle y(n) (kilyaw y gyflym 'withdrew hurriedly'); when they were placed first in the sentence or were in the comparative, they did not require the particle either.

Pronouns 
The personal pronouns have many forms with different functions. The independent forms are commonly used as objects, syntactically isolated or as fronted subjects. The reduplicated forms express emphasis, the  'conjunctive'  ones express contrast, and the  'infixed'  ones usually express objects or possessors, while being added to various particles and function words. The prepositional forms are added to prepositions ('conjugating' them). The forms as follows:

The variants i and di of the 1st and 2nd singular simple pronouns and inneu and ditheu of the corresponding conjunctive pronouns are used when these follow a conjugated verb, preposition or possessed noun; Evans (1970) terms them 'affixed' pronouns.

In the 3rd singular infixed pronoun, the allomorph -i/e is used after the words a, y, pan, tra and yny, while -s is used after ny, na, ry, neu, can, gwedy, kyt, o and pei.

The reflexive pronoun consists of the word hun (pl. hunein), preceded by a possessive pronoun (as in myself, yourself etc.). 

The most common relative pronoun is a. 

The demonstrative pronouns may be proximal or distal and distinguish, besides the masculine and the feminine form, a neuter one, which, however, corresponds with the plural. They are as follows: 

Some demonstrative adverbs are ynaeth 'then', yno 'there' (yna can mean both), ynoeth 'thither', yma(n) 'here', (y)velly 'so, thus'. Now was nw in early texts, but later weithon, i.e. y weith hon (lit. 'this time') or yn awr (lit. 'in/the hour').

Sawl is 'so many'. Meint 'number, size', ryw 'kind' and peth 'thing' can be used in various complex constructions with pronominal elements.

The main interrogative pronouns     
are pwy 'who' and pa/py 'which'. 'What' can be expressed as pa beth 'which thing?'. Others are pet 'how many', cwt 'where', pan 'whence', pi 'whose (always merged with a copula - pieu = pi+yw, pioed = pi+oed etc.).Universal pronouns are pawp, oll 'all' (with adjectival variants pop and holl) and cwbyl 'the whole'. Indefinite pronouns are nep 'any(one)' and dim 'any(thing)'.

 Verbs 
Finite forms
There are four tenses - present(-future), preterite, imperfect and pluperfect - and two moods (indicative and subjunctive). A subjunctive is distinguished from the indicative only in the present and the imperfect. The verb agrees with the subject (but it agrees in number only if the subject is placed before the verb, not after it). The inflection of the verb distinguishes two numbers and three persons, as well as a special 'impersonal' form, which is used in a way similar to a passive.

Contrary to the example of caru, the 3rd singular present of many or most verbs has i-affection, e.g. arch-af 'I ask', but eirch 'he asks'. Furthermore, some verbs, especially denominatives, have a 3rd singular ending -(h)a (originally part of a suffix). Some other, rare and archaic 3rd singular endings still occurring in Middle Welsh are -(h)it, -(h)awt, -yt, -yd. Of the different forms of the 3rd person of bot, yw, ynt follow the predicate, whereas (y) mae, (y) maent are placed in the beginning of the clause (and can alone mean 'where?' in questions); oes is used in negations, questions and conditions, mostly in the sense 'there is' ('there is' is also the meaning of the impersonal yssit; ys is used mostly with verbal nouns and in the mixed order, for which see the section Syntax).Evans 1970: 141-144

The 3rd singular ending may also be -i with penultimate i-affection.

Contrary to the example of caru, and unlike modern Welsh, the 3rd person singular preterite form most frequently ends in -wys or -ws, or in -s preceded by some other vowel as in -as, -es or -is, e.g. gallws 'was able'.

The second person singular exhibits y-affection.

The /h/ of the subjunctives is in the process of disappearing after vowels and sonorants, but causes provection (devoicing and gemination) after voiced consonants: e.g. dycko corresponding to 1st person singular indicative dygaf 'bring'. The subjunctive is used to express wishes, indefiniteness, purpose or a concession.

The 3rd singular may also end in -(h)it.

Note: Bot also has special 'consuetudinal' (habitual) forms for the present and past mostly formed from the stem byd-.

Non-finite forms

Both of the verbal adjectives have passive meaning: the one in -edic is a past participle passive (car-edic 'loved') and the one in -adwy is a future participle passive or gerundive (cred-adwy 'credible'). Less common suffixes with a past passive meaning are -at, -(h)awt and -eit.

The verbal noun is formed in a great variety of ways, the most common ones being:

1. just the verb stem with a zero suffix: adaw 'leave'

2. with the suffix -u, which is typical of stems containing -a, -ae, -e- and -y-: caru 'love', credu 'believe', kyrchy 'approach', including denominative stems in -ych-: bredychu 'betray'

3. with the suffix -aw, which is typical of stems ending in -i or containing -i-, -u-, -wy- or -eu- (keissyaw 'seek', gwisgaw 'dress', urdaw 'ordain', kwynaw 'complain', blodeuaw 'blossom')

4. with the suffix -i, which is typical of stems containing -o-/-oe- or ending in -w (adoli 'worship', merwi 'die'); there are also some stems containing -a-, which then undergo penultimate i-affection: erchi 'request'.

There are also some less common suffixes such as -ach, -aeth, -(a)el, -ec, -(e/y/u/i/ei)t, -n, wyn, -(ou)ein, -fa(n) and -s.

Verbal nouns are used very frequently in many periphrastic constructions, including prepositional phrases (with the preposition y - lit. 'towards V-ing', i.e. 'in order to V', with the preposition yn - lit. 'in (the process of) V-ing'), as an object of the verb gwneithur 'do' (lit. 'to do a V-ing'). They may even occur alone without a finite verb within a narrative (lit. 'And (there was) a V-ing'). The subject could be introduced by o 'from'.

 Prepositions 
Prepositions are 'conjugated', i.e. pronominal morphemes are added to the prepositions. The preposition may also undergo other changes, e.g.: 

A vowel appears before the preposition; it may be -a-, -o- or -y-, depending on the specific preposition, e.g. ar 'on' - arn-a-f 'on me', rac (/r̥ag/) 'before' - rag-of 'before me', gan 'from' - genhyf 'from me'. 

Most prepositions cause lenition (am, ar, gan etc.), but yn 'in' causes nasal mutation and a(c) 'with' causes spirant mutation. The prepositions themselves often occur with a lenited or non-lenited first consonant. Some notable prepositions are a(c) 'with', am 'around', amcan y 'about', ar 'on', at 'to', can(t) 'with, by', ker 'near, by', ech 'out of', eithyr 'outside', erbyn 'by, for, against', gwedy 'after', heb 'without', herwyd 'according to', gerfyd 'by', hyt 'until', is 'below', mal 'like', o(c) 'from', parth 'towards', rac (/r̥ag/) 'for' , (y) rwng (/r̥uŋ/) 'between', tan 'under' y 'to, for', tra(c) 'over, beyond', tros 'for, instead of', trwy 'through', y ('to', 'for', 'belonging to'), (y) tu (a(c)) 'towards', uch 'above', wrth 'at, by, for', y(n) 'in' (y before infixed pronouns), yr 'during, for'. Prepositional phrases often function as complex prepositions: ym penn 'at the end of' (from penn 'head, end'). As indicated elsewhere, y(n) may also introduce nominal predicates and words used adverbially.

 Syntax 
As in modern written Welsh, the VSO word order (Gwelod y brenin gastell: "Saw the king a castle") is not used exclusively in Middle Welsh, but irregular and mixed orders are also used: Y brenin a uelod gastell: ("[It was] the king that saw a castle"). The suggestion is that the mixed order places emphasis on the subject, and is often used in Welsh today to emphasise something. The formal difference between the two is that a negative particle (ny/na) precedes the subject in the mixed order (thus Ny brenin a uelod gastell would mean "It was not the king that saw the castle", but precedes the verb in the irregular order (thus Brenin ny uelod gastell = "The king did not see a castle"). Furthermore, the mixed order could preserve the copula that originally participated in this cleft construction (Ys y brenin a uelod gastell).

Unlike modern Welsh, however, the irregular or 'abnormal' orders are much more common than the 'normal' one, even though they require an additional particle to be grammatical. There are two main variations:

1. with a subject or object 'fronted' before the verb (SVO or OVS) and followed by the particle a (causing lenition) - e.g. Arawn a eirch y wrogaeth instead of Eirch Arawn y wrogaeth 'Arawn asks for his homage';

2. with an adverbial expression 'fronted' before the verb (AdvV) and followed by the particle y(d) (yd before a vowel; causing lenition) - e.g. Y Lynn Cuch y uynn hela instead of mynn ef hela y Lynn Cuch 'he wanted to hunt in Glynn Cuch'.

Both particles may also be replaced by ry or yr.

When the verb of a sentence is a copula governing a nominal predicate (P), early texts preferred the order VPS, but PVS becomes more common in the bulk of Middle Welsh prose. If the nominal predicate is not fronted, it may be introduced by the particle y(n): y bu (yn) barawt ('it's ready').

A direct question is introduced by a: A dywedy di ynni? 'Will you tell us?'

Modifiers, both adjectives and 'genitives', normally follow their nouns, e.g. gwreic dec 'a fair woman', pendeuic Dyuet 'the prince of Dyfed' (with lenition if the nouns are feminine). The nouns indicating a possessor (the 'genitive nouns') are, morphologically, just unmarked nouns juxtaposed with another noun (apart from the lenition after a feminine noun). Independent pronouns can be appended in the same way, redundantly, after a noun already modified by a possessive pronoun (y erchwys ef, lit. 'his dogs (of) him') and likewise after a 'conjugated preposition' (arnaf i, lit. 'on-me me'). An adjective may precede a noun if connected with it by the particle a 'which' (maur a teith 'a long journey') and a few adjectives such as hen 'old' and prif 'chief' are also normally placed in front of the noun.

Possession is expressed literally as '(possessed) is with (possessor)', rather than with a verb 'to have'.

 Numerals 
Only the cardinal numerals for 2 to 4 and the ordinal numerals for 3 to 4 have a gender distinction. The ordinal numerals are mostly formed with the suffix -uet, less commonly -et or -yd (masculine) / -ed (feminine), while '1st' and '2nd' are suppletively formed. The morphologically simple cardinal numerals and their corresponding ordinal numerals are as follows:

The numerals from 11 to 19 are formed in a variety of ways. 12 and 15 simply conjoin a simple numeral with the word 'ten' ; 11, 13, 14 are literally 'N on ten'; 16, 17, 18, 19 are 'N on fifteen', and 18 is 'two nines'. The original pattern was that of 12 and 15, and some early texts contain words for 11, 14 and 19 that follow the same pattern. The ordinals apply the ordinal form sometimes of the unit and sometimes with the word ten.
{| class="wikitable"
|+Teens
!
!numeral
!literally
!ordinal
|-
!11
|un ar dec
|'one on ten|unuet ar dec (undecuet)
|-
!12
|deudec
|'two-ten'''
|deudecuet|-
!13
|tri/teir ar dec|'three on ten
|trydydec|-
!14
|pedwar/pedeir ar dec|'four on ten
|
|-
!15
|pymthec|'five-ten|
|-
!16
|un ar bymthec
|'one on fifteen'''
|
|-
!17
|deu/dwy ar bymthec|'two on fifteen
|
|-
!18
|tri/teir ar bymthec
|'three on fifteen'''
|
|-
!19
|pedwar/pedeir ar bymthec|'four on fifteen'|
|}
Between 20 and 40, numbers are expressed as 'N on twenty'. The numbers from 40 to 180 are expressed using a vigesimal system, with multiples of 20 ('N twenties'), and, if necessary, units exceeding the nearest multiple designated as 'N and N twenties' (or, sometimes, as 'N twenties and N').

Hundreds and thousands are denoted by conjoining the unit they are multiples of with the words for 'hundred' and thousand. Exceeding units are indicated added to the hundred or the thousand using the word 'a(c)' 'and': 'N and N hundred' (or 'N hundred and N').

In accordance with this, the number 6,666 is expressed as chue guyr a thri ugeint a chuechant a chue mil, i.e. 'six men and three twenties and six hundred and six thousand'. Both cardinal and ordinal numerals generally precede the nouns that they modify (except for kyntaf 'first'); the noun after a cardinal may be in the singular, as in deu wr 'two men', or in the plural. If the numeral is composite, the noun comes after the first element: teir llong ar dec 'three ships on ten', i.e. '13 ships'. The phrases with a cardinal can also be constructed as 'N of Xs', e.g. tri o wyr 'three men', and this is the normal pattern with thousands (pym mil o wyr '5000 men'). Sometimes, compounds are formed: cannwr 'a hundred men'.

 Sample text 

See alsoGeiriadur Prifysgol Cymru, the standard historical Welsh dictionary
Medieval Welsh literature, Book of Llandaff, Mabinogion, Welsh law
Welsh orthography

References

Further reading

Evans, D. Simon, A Grammar of Middle Welsh, Medieval and Modern Welsh Series. Dublin: Dublin Institute for Advanced Studies, 1964. .
Morris-Jones, A Welsh grammar, historical and comparative. Oxford: Clarendon Press, 1913.
Morgan, Gareth, Reading Middle Welsh: A Course Book Based on the Welsh of the Mabinogi (1996).
Willis, David. 2009. Old and Middle Welsh. In Martin Ball & Nicole Müller (eds.), The Celtic Languages'', 117–60. London: Routledge.
 Luft, Diana, Peter Wynn Thomas and D. Mark Smith. eds. 2013. Rhyddiaith Gymraeg 1300-1425/Welsh Prose 1350–1425. Cardiff: Cardiff University. (A digital corpus of Middle Welsh texts.)

Languages attested from the 12th century
History of the Welsh language
Welsh language
Welsh, 2
Extinct languages of Europe